Sleep Party People is the alias of musician Brian Batz, hailing from Denmark.

History
Sleep Party People was formed in 2008 as a project of Brian Batz, influenced by artists like Boards of Canada, David Lynch and Erik Satie, starting a unique proposal of the Danish music scene. Since its beginning, the one-man project has been characterized by wearing rabbit masks in his photoshoots and live performances.

Contrary to the misconception that Sleep Party People is a band, Brian Batz is the sole member of Sleep Party People. Kaspar Kaae, Jacob Høegh, Ask Bock, Casper Hegstrup, Anders Stig Møller, Hans Hvidberg, Per Lyhne, Rasmus Lindahl, Line Felding, and Frederik Thybo have all performed with Batz in live shows. Batz explains in an interview with Motion Pikczer, "It's a bunch of good friends that's playing with me. So, it's not a band, it's just me and my bunnies, in a way."

Quickly gaining acceptance, Sleep Party People was featured in Soundvenue, a magazine covering the Danish music scene. After this, the record label Neh-Owh Records chose two of his songs to be featured in a compilation EP. In the end of 2009, Batz signed with the label A:larm Music. In 2010, he released his self-titled debut album with 10 songs.

With this success, Batz was featured in Dutch and British magazines.

In April 2012, Sleep Party People released a new album titled We Were Drifting on a Sad Song. In 2013, they toured the United Kingdom.

In 2013, Batz traveled to San Francisco to start to craft the third album in the company of producers Jeff Saltzman and Mikael Johnston. Batz recorded and wrote everything there and returned to Denmark with a nearly finished album. The album, Floating, was released in Scandinavia and Asia on May 30, 2014, and worldwide on June 2, 2014.

Sleep Party People was signed by Joyful Noise Recordings in February 2017.

Discography

Studio albums

Sleep Party People (2010)

We Were Drifting on a Sad Song (2012)

Floating (2014)

Lingering (2017)

Lingering Pt. II (2018)

Heap of Ashes (2022)

Singles
"A Dark God Heart" (2010)
"Remixes" (2011)
"Chin" (2012)
"Gazing at the Moon" (2012)
"In Another World" (2014)
"Floating Blood of Mine" (2014)
"The Missing Steps" (2017)
"Fainting Spell" (2017)
"The Sun Will Open Its Core" (2017)
"4th Drawer Down" (2018)
"The Mind Still Travels" (2018)
"The Fallen Barriers Parade" (2018)
"Moving Cluster" (2018)
"Renhoh 93" (2018)
"Outcast Gatherings" (2018)
"Tide" (2022)
"Spider Cracks" (2022)
"It Won't Be Cinematic" (2022)

Critical notes
The Current wrote: "As band names go, Sleep Party People is pretty apt. This Danish five-piece – who wear rabbit masks on stage to overcome shyness – create music for the early hours, when you're about to go to sleep but you've got a nice mug of tea to finish first. Combining a love of ambient music and old instruments, Sleep Party People draw on the post-rock soundscapes of Mogwai and Sigur Ros, with pretty melodies building to brutal climaxes."

References

External links
Myspace
Speed of Sound Label

Musical groups established in 2008
Danish alternative rock groups
Joyful Noise Recordings artists